The 2017–18 BYU Cougars women's basketball team will represent Brigham Young University during the 2017–18 NCAA Division I women's basketball season. It will be head coach Jeff Judkins's seventeenth season at BYU. The Cougars, members of the West Coast Conference, play their home games at the Marriott Center. They finished the season 16–14, 11–7 in WCC play to finish in a tie for third place. They lost in the quarterfinals of the WCC women's tournament to San Diego. They missed the postseason tournament for the first time since 2009.

Before the season

Departures

2017–18 media

BYU Radio Sports Network Affiliates

Cougar games that don't conflict with men's basketball or football games will be featured live on BYU Radio, found nationwide on Dish Network 980, on Sirius XM 143, and online at www.byuradio.org. Home games will be a BYUtv simulcast. Select road games will air on TheW.tv powered by Stadium.

Roster

Schedule

|-
!colspan=8 style=| Exhibition

|-
!colspan=8 style=| Non-conference regular season

|-
!colspan=8 style=| WCC regular season

|-
!colspan=8 style=| WCC Tournament

Game Summaries

Exhibition: Colorado Mesa
Broadcasters: Robbie Bullough & Keilani Unga 
Starting Lineups:
Colorado Mesa: Erin Reichle, Jaylyn Duran, Kelli Van Tassel, Karina Brandon, Ma'ata Epenisa
BYU: Brenna Chase, Shalae Salmon, Amanda Wayment, Malia Nawahine, Cassie Devashrayee

Southern Utah
Broadcasters: Robbie Bullough & Makenzi Pulsipher 
Series History: BYU leads 18–3
Starting Lineups:
Southern Utah: Rebecca Cardenas, Ashley Larsen, Breanu Reid, Whitney Johnson, Peyton Torgerson
BYU: Brenna Chase, Shalae Salmon, Amanda Wayment, Malia Nawahine, Cassie Devashrayee

Washington
Broadcasters: Gary Hill Jr. & Elise Woodward 
Series History: Washington leads 6–5
Starting Lineups:
BYU: Brenna Chase, Shalae Salmon, Amanda Wayment, Malia Nawahine, Cassie Devashrayee
Washington: Fapou Semebene, Amber Melgoza, Khalya Rooks, Jenna Moser, Missy Peterson

Eastern Washington
Broadcaster: Luke Byrnes 
Series History: BYU leads 3–1
Starting Lineups:
BYU: Brenna Chase, Shalae Salmon, Amanda Wayment, Malia Nawahine, Cassie Devashrayee
Eastern Washington: Uriah Howard, Symone Starks, Delaney Hodgins, Violet Kapri Morrow, Mariah Cunningham

Utah Valley
Broadcasters: Spencer Linton, Kristen Kozlowski, & Jason Shepherd 
Series History: BYU leads 7–0
Starting Lineups:
Utah Valley: Mariah Seals, Britta Spencer, Gabrielle Leos, Taylor Christensen, Leya Harvey
BYU: Brenna Chase, Shalae Salmon, Amanda Wayment, Malia Nawahine, Cassie Devashrayee

Georgia
Broadcaster: [[Dave McCann (sportscaster)|Dave McCann]] & Kristen Kozlowski'' 
Series History: Georgia leads 2–0
Starting Lineups:
Georgia: 
BYU:

See also
 2017–18 BYU Cougars men's basketball team

References

BYU Cougars women's basketball seasons
BYU
BYU Cougars
BYU Cougars